Edward H. Bersoff founded BTG, Inc. and served as its chief executive and president until 2001, when he sold the company to Titan Corporation.  He was elected to the board of Titan in February 2002 and holds board positions with a number of other organizations.

Prior to founding BTG in 1982, Bersoff was president of CTEC, Inc. In his earlier career as an officer in the U.S. Army, he was assigned to NASA's Electronics Research Center in Cambridge, Massachusetts.

He taught mathematics at New York University, Kingsborough Community College in New York, Northeastern University, Boston University and American University.

Bersoff served as chairman of the board of directors of the Virginia Economic Development Partnership and served by appointment of Virginia Governor George Allen on the Joint Subcommittee to Study Capital Access and Business Financing. He is the chairman of Greenwich Associates.

Bersoff holds A.B., M.S. and Ph.D. degrees in mathematics from New York University.

In November 2019, Bersoff was inducted into the Hall of Fame at the 2019 Greater Washington Government Contractor Awards.

References

American University faculty and staff
Living people
New York University faculty
American chief executives
New York University alumni
Year of birth missing (living people)